More Than You Deserve is a musical written by Jim Steinman and Michael Weller, produced by Joseph Papp and directed by Kim Friedman. After a workshop production lasting two weekends in April 1973 at the Other Stage (now known as the LuEsther Hall) of The Public Theater, it opened at the Newman Theater (also within The Public Theater) on November 21, 1973, ran for 63 performances and closed on January 13, 1974. Weller's original title for the play was Souvenirs, which referred to the severed ears of killed Viet Cong forces which the soldiers collected and wore as keepsakes on strings around their necks.

Original cast
 Major Michael Dillon - Fred Gwynne
 Fiona Markham - Kimberly Farr
 Nurse/Nin Hua - Leata Galloway
 Nurse/Uncle Remus - Mary Beth Hurt
 Nathan/Herbie/Pilot - Stephen Collins
 Dr. Smith/Sgt. Price - Graham Jarvis
 Luke/Lance Moriarty - Seth Allen
 Mike / Brown / Gerald Moore - Larry Marshall
 Perrine / Rabbit - Meat Loaf
 Wiley / Trout - Kim Milford
 Owlsy / Joe - Tom Leo
 Costucci / Lt. Maddox - Edward Zang
 Spooky 1 / Vietnamese - Justin Ross
 Spooky 2 / Vietnamese / Radio man - Eivie McGehee
 Melvin - Terry Kiser
 General Chet Eastacre - Ronald (Ron) Silver

Plot synopsis
The story is set in a United States Army base in Vietnam during the Vietnam War. Major Michael Dillon (Gwynne), who is impotent, falls in love with a reporter sent to cover the camp, who turns out to be a nymphomaniac when she is gang-raped by the other soldiers in the camp. However, she realizes at the end that she will be even happier giving up her newfound lust for sex to settle down with the impotent commander.

Song

The song that gives the musical its title was planned as a single in 1973, but ultimately cancelled. Only promotional copies exist. Years later Meat Loaf recorded the song again for his 1981 album Dead Ringer.

Other songs
 Overture
 Give Me the Simple Life
 Could She Be the One
 Where Did It Go?
 Come With Me (We Know Love)
 Mama, You'd Better Watch Out for Your Daughters
 More Than You Deserve
 O, What a War
 Song of the City of Hope
 To Feel So Needed
 Mama, You'd Better Watch Out for Your Daughters (reprise)
 Go, Go, Go, Guerrillas
 What Became of the People We Were
 If Only
 Midnight Lullabye
 Song of the Golden Egg
 What Became of the People We Were (reprise)

Legacy
Steinman and Meat Loaf first met during the production and would go on to make the multi-platinum album Bat Out of Hell. The title track from the show was recorded by Meat Loaf for the album Dead Ringer. He also performed the song on his show VH1 Storytellers.

Paul Shaffer served as musical director for the show.

Citations

1973 musicals
Off-Broadway musicals
Vietnam War in popular culture
Musicals by Jim Steinman